Ash Green Halt railway station known for a time as Ash Green, served the village of Ash, Surrey in England on the original route of the Alton Line which ran from London via the town of Guildford to the east.

History
The London and South Western Railway opened the station in 1849 as a halt (request stop) between Guildford railway station and Farnham railway station before the opening of the shorter route with a line off the South West Main Line to the north from London via Aldershot to Farnham.  As a result of the 1923 Grouping, the LS&WR became part of the new Southern Railway, which closed Ash Green in 1937.

The station was renamed several times, alternating between Ash and Ash Green, with the suffix added in 1926.

The station building is now a private house, along with the Up platform.

References

Sources
 
 
 

Disused railway stations in Surrey
Railway stations in Great Britain opened in 1849
Railway stations in Great Britain closed in 1937
1849 establishments in England
Former London and South Western Railway stations